Mass transit incident may refer to

Mass Transit incident (professional wrestling), a professional wrestling public relations scandal
Aviation accidents and incidents
Train wreck
List of road accidents
Shipwrecks

See also

Lists of disasters